The Big Knife is a 1955 melodrama directed and produced by Robert Aldrich from a screenplay by James Poe based on the 1949 play by Clifford Odets. The film stars Jack Palance, Ida Lupino, Wendell Corey, Jean Hagen, Rod Steiger, Shelley Winters, Ilka Chase, and Everett Sloane.

Plot
Charlie Castle, a very successful Hollywood actor, lives in a huge home with all the amenities associated with his stardom. Influential gossip columnist Patty Benedict visits him to get the lowdown on his marriage, but Castle refuses to confirm anything for her. His wife Marion has taken their young son and is living separately from him; she is, in fact, on the verge of filing for divorce. She has had enough of his drunken womanizing and of his having relinquished his ideals for lower Hollywood expectations.

Marion does not want him to renew his contract with powerful studio boss Stanley Shriner Hoff, and will not agree to a reconciliation with her husband if he signs. An emotionally-tortured Castle wants desperately to win back Marion, who has been proposed to by writer, and friend of Castle's, Hank Teagle. Castle agrees, wanting to be free of the studio's grip on his life and his career, and to be able to do more inspiring work than the schlock films Hoff pushes on him.

He pleads with his needy agent, Nat, to help him be free. However, Nat is aware that Hoff and his right-hand man, Smiley Coy, have knowledge of the truth behind a hit-and-run accident in which Castle was behind the wheel and which resulted in a death. Castle's friend, Buddy Bliss, took the blame for the accident and served time for it.

Hoff and Coy arrive at Castle's house to close the deal. Castle's defiance enrages Hoff, who is willing to do anything, including blackmail regarding the accident, to force the actor to commit to a seven-year deal. In the end, the simple fact of blackmail works and Castle signs the new contract.

Buddy's aggressively flirtatious wife, Connie, comes by; despondent, Castle allows the darker side of his nature to prevail and he sleeps with her. Subsequently, Marion and Hank attend a gathering at Castle's place after which Castle prevails upon his wife to listen once again to his reasoning as to why they should reunite. She eventually leaves with Hank but is actually having second thoughts about Castle.

Meanwhile, Smiley, who has been attending a party at one of Castle's neighbors, drops in to tell the actor that Dixie Evans, a struggling starlet who happens to have been in the car with Castle the night of the accident, is threatening to reveal what she knows about the crash. Smiley suggests Castle invite her over, to talk and see if he can persuade her to keep quiet. Castle does so and is sympathetic to her feelings about being treated shabbily and disregarded as an actress. She wants to damage Hoff, not Castle.

Having had Hank take her back to Castle, Marion arrives while Dixie is there. The actress immediately leaves and the couple have an intense conversation; Marion makes it clear she is at least willing to try again to rekindle their marriage.

Subsequently, Dixie goes to Hoff's office and causes such an upheaval that the studio head and Smiley decide that she must be permanently silenced.  Smiley lays out a plan to achieve this to Castle which involves murder.  Finally spurred to stand up for his ideals, the actor summons Hoff and Nat and, with Marion present and now aware of Dixie's presence the night of the accident, defies these ruthless men who employ him. He also mandates that nothing should happen to Dixie.

Hoff and Smiley try one more extortion ploy, producing recordings secretly made of Marion with Hank. Neither Marion nor Castle are moved by this attempt and, finally, an outraged Hoff lets Castle go.  "You're through," Smiley tells the actor. After a brief, quiet respite, Buddy storms in to reveal that he has discovered Castle's fling with Connie. Rather than take Castle up on his offer to allow himself to be hit, Buddy spits in his face.

Castle asks for a bath to be drawn and, after pledging to Marion "a better future", goes upstairs. Smiley returns to telephone Hoff and let him know that Dixie, staggering out of a bar and into the street, was struck and killed by a city bus.

Despite seemingly redeeming himself in many ways, Castle is devastated by his betrayal of a friend, sacrificed his integrity and anguished the woman he adores. Smiley, Marion, and Nat break into the bathroom. As Marion screams, Smiley gets on the phone and tells the studio that Castle died of a heart attack, while also saying to tell Stanley that he slashed himself three times. Marion grieves, as the camera pulls back and reveals we're watching her wails on a cinema screen.

Cast

 Jack Palance as Charlie Castle
 Ida Lupino as Marion Castle
 Wendell Corey as Smiley Coy
 Jean Hagen as Connie Bliss
 Rod Steiger as Stanley Shriner Hoff
 Shelley Winters as Dixie Evans
 Ilka Chase as Patty Benedict
 Everett Sloane as Nat Danziger
 Wesley Addy as Horatio "Hank" Teagle
 Paul Langton as Buddy Bliss
 Nick Dennis as Mickey Feeney
 Bill Walker as Russell
 Michael Winkelman as Billy Castle
 Strother Martin as Stillman

Production
In March 1955 Aldrich signed a contract with Clifford Odets to make the film. A script by James Poe had already been written and Jack Palance set to star. The film was made for Aldrich's own company.

Aldrich said he was "terribly ambivalent about the Hoff character". When he made the film many old time tycoons were still in power. 
We'd had twenty years of petty dictators running the industry, during which time everybody worked and everybody got paid, maybe not enough, but they weren't on relief. Seventeen years later you wonder if the industry is really more healthy in terms of creativity. Are we making more or better pictures without that central control? But when everybody worked under those guys, they hated them. So we took the drumroll from Nuremberg and put it under the Hoff character's entrances and exits. It wasn't too subtle... The Hoff crying came from Mayer, who is reported to have been able to cry at the drop of an option. But the big rebuff that Odets suffered was at the hands of Columbia, so there was more of Cohn in the original play than there was of Mayer.
Aldrich later said he wished he and the writer had cut down Clifford Odets' play. "At the time, I thought that kind of theatrical flavoring was extraordinary. I'm afraid neither Jim Poe nor I were tough enough in editing some of Odets' phrases as we should have been."

Reception

Critical response
New York Times film critic Bosley Crowther, was disappointed and believed the plot lacked credibility. He wrote:

Film critic Jeff Stafford analyzed some of the film's elements, and wrote:

Pop culture writer Nathan Rabin stated that:

The Big Knife is a film of excess. It's over-written, over-acted, overwrought and over-emotional. It's full of bombast and shouting and actorly monologues but the film has the courage of its convictions. It's unrelenting and unsparing in its depiction of the film industry as a hellscape where the worst of capitalism meets the worst of the arts.

Box office
Aldrich later claimed that although the film cost $400,000 and made over $1 million it lost him money because the distributor took the profits.

Awards
Wins
 Venice Film Festival: Silver Lion, Robert Aldrich; 1955.

Nominations
 Venice Film Festival: Golden Lion, Robert Aldrich; 1955

Stage play

The Big Knife premiered on Broadway at the
National Theatre on February 24, 1949 and closed on May 28, 1949 after 109 performances. Directed by Lee Strasberg, the play starred John Garfield as Charles Castle. The first Broadway revival opened at the American Airlines Theatre on April 16, 2013, produced by Roundabout Theatre Company, directed by Doug Hughes and starring Bobby Cannavale and Richard Kind.

Home media
The Big Knife was released to DVD by MGM Home Video on April 1, 2003 as a Region 1 widescreen DVD.

Gallery

See also
List of American films of 1955

References

External links
 
 
 
 

1955 films
1955 drama films
American black-and-white films
American drama films
American films based on plays
1950s English-language films
Film noir
Films about actors
Films about Hollywood, Los Angeles
Films based on works by Clifford Odets
Films directed by Robert Aldrich
Films scored by Frank De Vol
Films set in Beverly Hills, California
Films with screenplays by James Poe
United Artists films
1950s American films
Melodrama films